Phytopathologia Mediterranea is a scientific journal published by the Mediterranean Phytopathological Union, since 1967.  It is included in the Journal Citation Reports in the subject category Plant Sciences. The journal publishes original research and reviews in all areas of plant pathology, with special attention to the phytopathological problems of the Mediterranean region.

External links 
Mediterranean Phytopathological Union (Publisher)
http://www.fupress.com/pm

References 

Botany journals
Publications established in 1967